Documentary films about war include:

List of World War II documentary films
On Two Fronts: Latinos & Vietnam
The Great War (documentary)
The War (2007 TV series)
The Invisible War
The Unknown War (documentary)
The Fog of War
List of Afghanistan War (2001–present) documentaries
The Civil War (TV series)
Hearts and Minds (film)
Stop Genocide
List of documentary films about the Korean War

War